Lee Ellison (born 13 January 1973) is an English former footballer who played in the Football League for Darlington, Hartlepool United, Leicester City, Crewe Alexandra and Hereford United.

References

External links
 

English footballers
English Football League players
1973 births
Living people
Darlington F.C. players
Hartlepool United F.C. players
Leicester City F.C. players
Crewe Alexandra F.C. players
Hereford United F.C. players
Southport F.C. players
Association football forwards